Marquess of Altamira is a Spanish noble title.

On December 23, 1702, King Philip V of Spain granted the title to Don Luis Sánchez de Tagle y de la Rasa, 1st Marquess of Altamira from the previous title of Viscount Tagle.

Famous members include Don Luis Sánchez de Tagle, 1st Marquess of Altamira who was once the most influential and richest man in New Spain, Don Pedro Sánchez de Tagle known as the "Father of Tequila" and first Empress of Mexico, Empress Ana Maria, who is the great great great grandniece of Don Luis Sánchez de Tagle. The holders of the title were all members of the House of Tagle, an aristocratic family in Spain and Mexico during the 17th, 18th and 19th centuries.

The members of the family also married into powerful Spanish nobles houses such as that of the Dukes of Moctezuma de Tultengo and the Dukes of Tetuán.

A cadet branch of the House of Tagle also established themselves in the Philippines, where they soon became one of that country's richest families. Having historical associations with the Principalia, the native aristocracy of the Philippines, some notable members of this branch are the socialite Isabel Preysler and the actress Anna Maria Perez de Tagle, who is Filipino-American.

Viscounts of Tagle
 Don Luis Sánchez de Tagle, Viscount Tagle (created Marquess of Altamira on December 23, 1702)
 Don Juan Manuel Pérez de Tagle, Viscount Tagle (created Marquess of Salinas on October 20, 1733)

Marquesses of Altamira
 Don Luis Sánchez de Tagle, 1st Marquess of Altamira
 Don Pedro Sánchez de Tagle, 2nd Marquess of Altamira, son-in-law and eldest son of the 1st Marquess' eldest brother
 Doña Manuela Sánchez de Tagle, 3rd Marchioness of Altamira, eldest daughter of the 2nd Marquess
 Doña Luisa Pérez de Tagle, 4th Marchioness of Altamira, only daughter of the 3rd Marquesa
 Don Manuel Rodríguez de Albuerne y Pérez de Tagle, 5th Marquess of Altamira, eldest son of the 4th Marquesa
 Doña María de la Paz Rodriguez de Albuerne y Girón, 6th Marchioness of Altamira, eldest daughter of the 5th Marquess
 Doña Luisa Álvarez de Abreú y Rodríguez de Albuerne, 7th Marchioness of Altamira, eldest daughter of the 6th Marchionesse's youngest sister
 Doña Maria del Mar Alvarez de Abreu y Rodriguez de Albuerne, 8th Marchioness of Altamira, only sister of the 7th Marchioness
 Don Carlos Manuel O'Donnell y Álvarez de Abreú, 2nd Duke of Tetuan, 9th Marquess of Altamira and Grandee of Spain, eldest son of 8th Marchioness
 Doña María de las Mercedes O'Donnell y Vargas, 10th Marquesa of Altamira, eldest daughter of the 9th Marquess
 Doña María Victoria O'Donnell y Vargas, 11th Marquesa of Altamira, younger sister of the 10th Marchioness and daughter of the 9th Marquess
 Don Federico Kirkpatrick y O'Donnell, 12th Marquess de Altamira, second son of the 11th Marchioness
 Don Alfonso O' Donnell y Lara, 13th Marquess de Altamira, the 12th Marquess' cousin, second son of the 9th Marquess' 5th child
 Don Hugo O'Donnell y Duque de Estrada, 7th Duke of Tetuan, 14th Marquess of Altamira and Grandee of Spain, nephew of the 13th Marquess
 Don Carlos O'Donnell de Armada, 15th Marquess of Altamira and Grandee of Spain, eldest son of the 14th Marquess

References
 Elenco de Grandezas y Títulos Nobiliarios españoles. Instituto "Salazar y Castro", C.S.I.C.
 Tagle. Enigma de un nombre, Historia de un pueblo. Author: José Luis Sáiz Fernández
 Nobleza Colonial de Chile. Author: J. Mujica
 Diccionario Heráldico y Genealógico de Apellidos Españoles. Author: Alberto y Arturo García Garrafa
 Nobiliario de los reinos y Señorios de España. Author: Francisco Piferrer
 La Sociedad Chilena del siglo XVIII, Mayorazgos y Títulos de Castilla. Author: Domingo Amunátegui Solar
 Patrons, Partisans, and Palace intrigues: the court society of Colonial Mexico. Author: Christoph Rosenmüller
 Hacienda and market in eighteenth-century Mexico: Second Edition, The Rural Economy of the Guadalajara. Author: Eric Van Young and John H. Coatsworth

External links
 http://www.geneall.net/H/tit_page.php?id=10856
 http://www.losvargas.org/genealog/gene3015.html
 http://heirsofeurope.blogspot.com/2010/02/tetuan.html
 http://www.geneall.net/H/per_page.php?id=646639
 https://web.archive.org/web/20121019063317/http://users.telenet.be/JoseVerheecke/link/afstamming/Moctezuma.txt

Marquessates in the Spanish nobility
 
O'Donnell dynasty
1702 establishments in Spain
Noble titles created in 1702